Triples was an American breakfast cereal produced by General Mills in the 1990s that was similar to Rice Krispies. The name was derived from the three grains — corn, wheat and rice — from which the product was composed. A television commercial for Triples involved participants shaking their heads three times to a strange sound (a "triple take"). Consumer surveys reported that it made the milk a perfect level of sweetness while only using 4g of sugar per serving.

External links
 Triples at Mr. Breakfast

General Mills cereals
Products introduced in 1993
1990s disestablishments